This List of hills of Hamburg shows a selection of hills in the German federal state Hamburg − sorted by height in metres above sea level (NN):

See also 
 List of the highest mountains in Germany
 List of the highest mountains in the German states
 List of mountain and hill ranges in Germany

Hamburg
!
Mount